Monaco Bank is a submarine volcano in the Azores, which last erupted in 1911.

See also
 List of volcanoes in Azores

References

Seamounts of the Atlantic Ocean
Active volcanoes